Topon Kumar Gogoi (born 1 March 1969) is an Indian politician and the incumbent Member of the Lok Sabha from Jorhat. He was elected in Assam Legislative Assembly election in 2016 from Sonari constituency.  He was also the minister of state for Power (independent charge) in Government of Assam.

References 

Living people
Bharatiya Janata Party politicians from Assam
People from Charaideo district
Assam MLAs 2016–2021
India MPs 2019–present
1969 births